Vassar Benjamin Carlton (November 13, 1912 – August 31, 2005) was a justice of the Florida Supreme Court from 1969 to 1974, serving as chief justice for his final year on the Court.

Born in Alachua County, Florida, Carlton received an LL.B. from Stetson University in 1937, and was elected a Brevard County judge just four years later, in 1941, at 27 years old. He thereafter remained in the judiciary. In 1954, "he was elected Circuit Judge of Florida's old Ninth Circuit" remaining in that office until his election to the Florida Supreme Court in 1968, where he commenced service on January 7, 1969. He was chosen as chief justice for a term beginning January 1, 1973, remaining in that office until his retirement on February 28, 1974.

Carlton died in Franklin, North Carolina.

References

Justices of the Florida Supreme Court
1912 births
2005 deaths
People from Alachua County, Florida
Stetson University College of Law alumni
Chief Justices of the Florida Supreme Court
20th-century American judges